Jerry is an unincorporated community in Asotin County, in the U.S. state of Washington. "JERRY, a town in the northeastern part of Asotin County, named
by John Knight, on August 1, 1906, in honor -of Jerry McGuire, a stock
rancher who owned land there since 1875. The former name was
Grand Junction, because Asotin and George Creeks joined there."
(James Buchan, in Names MSS., Letter 317.)

History
A post office called Jerry was established in 1906, and remained in operation until 1918. The community was named after Jerry McGuire, a local cattleman.

References

Unincorporated communities in Asotin County, Washington
Unincorporated communities in Washington (state)